The Democratic Confederation of Free Trade Unions (LIGA) in a national trade union center in Hungary. It was founded in 1989.

LIGA is affiliated with the International Trade Union Confederation and the European Trade Union Confederation.

References

External links
Official site

1989 establishments in Hungary
European Trade Union Confederation
International Trade Union Confederation
National trade union centers of Hungary
Trade Union Advisory Committee to the OECD
Trade unions established in 1989